Yan Bingtao (born 16 February 2000) is a Chinese professional snooker player. He rose to prominence by winning the ISBF World Snooker Championship, the sport's world amateur title, in 2014 at age 14, which made him the tournament's youngest ever winner. He turned professional in 2016, becoming the first player born in the 21st century to do so.

Aged 17 years and 284 days, Yan became the youngest player ever to contest a ranking final when he faced Mark Williams at the 2017 Northern Ireland Open; Williams won in a deciding frame. Yan claimed his first ranking title at the 2019 Riga Masters, becoming the third Chinese player, after Ding Junhui and Liang Wenbo, to win a ranking event. He made his Masters debut at the 2021 event, where he defeated John Higgins 10–8 in the final to win his first Triple Crown title. Aged 20, Yan became the youngest Masters winner since 19-year-old Ronnie O'Sullivan in 1995.  

In December 2022, the WPBSA suspended Yan from the professional tour amid a match-fixing investigation. He was subsequently charged with fixing matches and betting on snooker.

Career

Early years
Yan Bingtao was born on 16 February 2000 in the city of Zibo, in Shandong province, China. In December 2011, aged only 11, Yan reached the final of the Zibo City championship. The following year, he became Shandong Provincial champion, in Qingdao.

Amateur
Yan began to feature in professional competitions at the start of the 2013–14 season, aged 13, in Asian Players Tour Championship events, and as a wildcard player in Chinese ranking tournaments. His first win against a professional came in his first match, against Vinnie Calabrese in the 2013 Yixing Open. He also secured wins over Stuart Bingham, Yu Delu, Barry Pinches and Liang Wenbo during the 2013–14 and 2014–15 seasons. He reached the last 32 of the 2014 Wuxi Classic and 2014 Shanghai Masters.

Qualification for professional status
In November 2014, Yan won the Amateur World Snooker Championship, beating Muhammad Sajjad of Pakistan 8–7 in the final. Aged 14, Yan also became the youngest winner of the event beating Zhou Yuelong, who won it aged 15 in 2013. This win earned him a two-year professional card for the 2015–16 and 2016–17 seasons.

Yan was unable to take up his entry in the first ranking tournament of the 2015–16 season, the 2015 Australian Goldfields Open, after failing to obtain a UK Visa. 
He was selected for the Chinese B team in the 2015 Snooker World Cup, with Zhou Yuelong as his teammate.
China B started as 50/1 outsiders but they topped their group, knocking out England in the process, before beating Australia and Wales in the knock-out stages, and Scotland in the final. Between them they pocketed a cheque for US$200,000. Defeated finalist Stephen Maguire stated that he believed he had watched two future world champions. Shortly afterwards it was announced that Yan's tour card would be deferred until the 2016–17 season in order for him to complete his education in China and become eligible for a working visa. He did though play in the Champion of Champions for which he gained entry through his World Cup win and, on his debut in the UK, he beat Shaun Murphy 4–2, before losing 3–6 to Neil Robertson in the quarter-finals.

Yan finished the year by winning the San Yuan Cup, an amateur Chinese competition, in Chengdu, beating Jin Long 5–4 in the final.

2016–17 season 
A trio of deciding frame wins saw Yan reach the fourth round of the Paul Hunter Classic, where he lost 1–4 to Dominic Dale. He also got to the same stage of the English Open with a 4–3 victory over Mark Allen, but again was beaten 4–1 this time by Ricky Walden. His third last 16 exit of the season came at the Northern Ireland Open as he was edged out 4–3 by Anthony Hamilton. After knocking out Liang Wenbo 6–4 in the second round of the UK Championship, Yan met World Cup partner Zhou and was defeated 5–6. Yan qualified for the German Masters by overcoming Sam Baird 5–1 and Shaun Murphy 5–4 and at the venue beat Dale 5–2 and Michael Holt 5–1 to reach the first ranking event quarter-final of his career, which he lost 2–5 to Stuart Bingham. Yan defeated world number one Mark Selby 4–1 in the third round of the Welsh Open, before being knocked out by a reversal of this scoreline to Kurt Maflin. Yan became the second youngest player to compete at the World Championship which he qualified for by beating Sam Craigie 10–8, Mark Davis 10–7 and Alexander Ursenbacher 10–4.
He won his first frame at the Crucible with a century break, but was 3–6 down to Shaun Murphy after the opening session. Yan was also 5–9 behind, but won three frames in a row without Murphy potting a ball. He had a good advantage in the 18th frame, but Murphy fluked a red and then cleared the table to eliminate Yan 10–8.
At the end of his debut campaign as a professional he was 56th in the world rankings, the second highest of all the players that started the year with no ranking points.

2017–18 season 
Following his debut, Yan had another successful campaign in the 2017–18 season. His wins over Ronnie O'Sullivan, Ricky Walden, Jack Lisowski, and John Higgins, saw him make his first career semi final, where he lost 2–9 to Mark Allen. He then reached his first career final in the Northern Ireland Open later that month, beating the likes of Robbie Williams, Jamie Barrett, Mark King, Ryan Day, Robert Milkins, and Lyu Haotian along the way, before losing 8–9 to Mark Williams. His world ranking rose rapidly again, standing at 23rd by the end of the season.

2018–19 season 
Yan's performance in the 2018–19 season perhaps was not as strong as the previous season, but his consistency helped his world ranking to climb to 21st.

2019–20 season – First ranking title 
This season was Yan's best career season yet. He reached one quarter final, four semi finals, and one final. In addition, Yan defeated Mark Joyce 5–2 in the Riga Masters final to claim his maiden ranking title, becoming the youngest title winner since Ding Junhui won the 2006 Northern Ireland Open. Later in the season, Yan reached the final stage of the World Snooker Championship again, but lost to Judd Trump in the second round.

2020–21 season – Masters champion 
Yan secured his first triple crown event title at the Masters after beating Neil Robertson, Stephen Maguire, Stuart Bingham, and John Higgins. He became the first debutant to win the tournament since Mark Selby in 2008, and the second Chinese winner of the event after Ding Junhui lifted the title in 2011. He also became the youngest player (20 years old) to win the tournament since Ronnie O'Sullivan in 1995.

Performance and rankings timeline

Career finals

Ranking finals: 4 (1 title)

Non-ranking finals: 1 (1 title)

Pro-am finals: 2 (1 title)

Team finals: 2 (1 title)

Amateur finals: 2 (1 title)

References

External links
Yan Bingtao at CueTracker.net: Snooker Results and Statistic Database
Yan Bingtao at worldsnooker.com

2000 births
Sportspeople from Zibo
Living people
Chinese snooker players